"Lovesongs (They Kill Me)" is a glam rock song by German band Cinema Bizarre, from their debut album Final Attraction. The song hit #9 on the German Hot 100, making it their highest charting single to date.

Track listing
These are the formats and track listings of major single releases of "Lovesongs (They Kill Me)".

CD Single
"Lovesongs (They Kill Me)" – 3:44
"Escape To The Stars (Rough Edge Mix)" – 4:13

CD Maxi
"Lovesongs (They Kill Me)" – 3:44
"She Waits For Me" – 3:13
"Lovesongs (They Kill Me) (Kyau & Albert Remix)" – 6:36
"Lovesongs (They Kill Me) (Instrumental)" – 3:44

Cardboard CD Single>
"Lovesongs (They Kill Me) (Album Version)" – 3:44
"Lovesongs (They Kill Me) (Hot Like Me, Freak Like Me Club Mix)" - 6:19
"Lovesongs (They Kill Me) (Extended Remix)" - 6:41
"Lovesongs (They Kill Me) (IAMX Remix)" - 4:52

Chart performance
"Lovesongs (They Kill Me)" has been listed for 36 weeks in three different charts. Its first appearance was week 38/2007 in the Austria Singles Top 75 and the last appearance was week 35/2008 in the France Singles Top 100. Its peak position was number 9, on the Germany Singles Top 100, it stayed there for one week. Its highest entry was number 9 in the Germany Singles Top 100.

Charts

Weekly charts

Year-end charts

References

2007 singles
Cinema Bizarre songs
Songs written by Michelle Leonard
2007 songs
Island Records singles